is a Japanese singer and voice actress from Kasuga, Fukuoka. She is known for singing and acting in several Goro Miyazaki movies including Tales from Earthsea and From up on Poppy Hill.

Early life 
Aoi Teshima was born on June 21, 1987 in Kasuga, Fukuoka, Japan. From an early age, she was influenced by her parent's liking for classic musical films, such as The Wizard of Oz, The Secret Garden, The Little Prince, and Breakfast at Tiffany's. Of that, Teshima has attributed the song, Moon River, along with the music of Ella Fitzgerald, Louis Armstrong, and Billie Holiday as the basis for her love for Jazz music, and as major influences on her musical style.  In junior high school, Teshima found herself moved by Bette Midler's 1979 song, The Rose, her amateur cover of which became the trigger of her debut as a singer.

Career
After graduating junior high, Teshima enrolled at the C&S Music School in Fukuoka, to acquire the qualifications of high school and junior college while simultaneously developing her singing abilities. There, she began a music career as an amateur in 2003. In 2003 and 2004, she participated in the musical event DIVA, held in Fukuoka, as part of the Yamaha Music-sponsored Teen's Music Festival.

In March 2005, she performed at the Japan-Korea Slow Music World event in South Korea, where her performance was favourably received amongst the audience, attracting the attention of anime director Gorō Miyazaki. The Studio Ghibli music producer, Toshio Suzuki, was reportedly very impressed when he listened to her demo version of The Rose at the recommendation of Miyazaki.  

On June 7, 2006, the release of  became her major debut. The song was the theme of the Gorō Miyazaki directed film, Tales from Earthsea, in which she also voices the character Theru. This song debuted at #5 on the Oricon charts, with the number of CD shipments numbering at about 300,000, along with music downloads recorded at about 650,000 downloads, which was the largest for the theme song of the Studio Ghibli series at the time.

In 2011, she once again collaborated with Gorō Miyazaki on his second feature, From up on Poppy Hill (2011), singing Summer of Goodbye, the main theme of the movie and other songs in the film, as well as voicing the character Yuko. 

On September 30, 2012, she was presented with the Citizens Cultural Award of Kasuga City.

On February 10, 2016, she released the first single from her 10th album, Ren'dez-vous, titled . This song was used in Japanese drama Love That Makes You Cry, and charted at top on the Billboard Japan Hot 100 chart.

Personal life 
Teshima has described herself to be 'stubborn and strong-willed', and added that she is also camera-shy.

Discography

Original albums

Cover albums 
Teshima's cover albums are sung in English.

Compilation albums

Singles

References

External links
  
 Aoi Teshima profile at Oricon 

People from Fukuoka
Studio Ghibli people
Japanese voice actresses
1987 births
Living people
Music articles needing expert attention
Musicians from Fukuoka Prefecture
21st-century Japanese singers
21st-century Japanese women singers